Simeon Henry Jean LaRocque (February 26, 1863 – May 31, 1933) was a professional baseball player.  He was a second baseman over parts of three seasons (1888, 1890–91) with the Detroit Wolverines, Pittsburgh Alleghenys/Pirates and Louisville Colonels.  For his career, he compiled a .249 batting average, with two home runs and 50 runs batted in.

He was born in Saint-Mathias-sur-Richelieu, Quebec and later died in Highland Park, Michigan at the age of 70.

External links

1863 births
1933 deaths
19th-century baseball players
Baseball people from Quebec
Beaumont Oilers players
Birmingham Barons players
Canadian expatriate baseball players in the United States
Detroit Wolverines players
Pittsburgh Alleghenys players
Pittsburgh Pirates players
Louisville Colonels players
Major League Baseball second basemen
Major League Baseball players from Canada
Memphis Egyptians players
Savannah Pathfinders players
Charleston Seagulls players
San Antonio Bronchos players
People from Montérégie
Nashville Tigers players
Lewiston (minor league baseball) players
Seattle Hustlers players
Paterson Silk Weavers players